Kustaa Aadolf Jussila (8 October 1879, in Orivesi – 9 February 1964) was a Finnish farmer and politician. He was a member of the Parliament of Finland from 1936 to 1939, representing the Patriotic People's Movement (IKL). He was the elder brother of Eetu Jussila.

References

1879 births
1964 deaths
People from Orivesi
People from Häme Province (Grand Duchy of Finland)
Patriotic People's Movement (Finland) politicians
Members of the Parliament of Finland (1936–39)
Finnish fascists